Patrick J. Stefano (born 1965/66) is a Pennsylvania politician. A Republican, he is currently a Pennsylvania State Senator for the 32nd district. Prior to being elected to the State Senate in the 2014 election, Stefano served as vice president of the Fayette County Chamber of Commerce.

References

External links
Pat Stefano for State Senate campaign website

Living people
People from Fayette County, Pennsylvania
1960s births
Republican Party Pennsylvania state senators
21st-century American politicians